The 2009 New York City Public Advocate election took place on Tuesday, November 3, 2009, along with elections for the mayor, the city comptroller, borough presidents, and members of the New York City Council. The Democratic candidate, Bill de Blasio, won election with 77% of the vote against 18% for the Republican nominee, Alex Zablocki, 3.6% for the Conservative nominee, William Lee, and 1.7% for two others.

The public advocate has the formal role of presiding over meetings of the New York City Council (although the Speaker elected by the Council itself now does much of this work), and, until the next election, would serve as acting Mayor whenever the elected Mayor is unable to serve.

This election has drawn significant interest from politicians looking to advance their careers, as the extension of New York City term limits allows more incumbents to seek reelection.

Candidates

Democratic party
Despite the extension of term limits in late 2008, the outgoing public advocate, Betsy Gotbaum announced that she would not run for reelection.

Candidates included Councilman Eric Gioia of Queens, who has raised $2.5 million for the campaign; Norman Siegel, the civil liberties lawyer who lost in a runoff to Gotbaum in 2001; former public advocate Mark Green, and Councilman Bill de Blasio of Brooklyn.

After acknowledging he was considering the race in December 2008, former Public Advocate Mark J. Green announced on February 10, 2009, that he would again run for the office.  Green was Gotbaum's predecessor as public advocate and the first person to hold this title.  His entry changed the landscape of the race, due to his name recognition and ability to raise money.

Councilman John Liu, also from Queens, had been considered a potential candidate for advocate, but he ran for and won the office of New York City Comptroller—an office uncontested by the current city comptroller, Bill Thompson, who preferred to seek election as mayor in 2009.  Councilwoman Jessica Lappin and Guillermo Linares, a former councilman and current commissioner of the Mayor's Office of Immigrant Affairs, were also considering a run  Assemblyman Adam Clayton Powell IV was also considered a potential candidate.  Lappin decided not to run. Imtiaz S. Syed, a lawyer, economist, investigative accountant, banker, administrator and management consultant, also ran.

On September 15, 2009, de Blasio won 32.6% of the Democratic primary vote and Green 31.5%. (Most of the remaining 36% of the primary voters cast their ballots for Gioia or Siegel.) Neither de Blasio nor Green won enough votes (40%) to avoid a run-off primary election between them two weeks later.

On September 29, Bill de Blasio won that Democratic primary run-off by 62.4% to 37.6% for Mark Green. Turnout was very light, about 220,000 or 10% of the eligible voters, according to The Associated Press. (In the same run-off election, John Liu led his fellow City Councilman David Yassky, of Brooklyn, for the Democratic nomination for New York City Comptroller by 56% to 44% of a similar turnout.)

Republican party
Alex Zablocki, an aide to State Senator Andrew Lanza of Staten Island, declared his candidacy.  At 26 years old, Zablocki was the youngest candidate to run for public advocate.

Other parties
William Lee, Conservative Party of New York
Maura DeLuca, Socialist Workers Party
Jim Lesczynski, Libertarian Party of New York

Campaign
Gotbaum set up meetings with each of her potential successors in order to help them understand the position.  On March 30, 2009, Alex Zablocki, Republican candidate for public advocate, met with Gotbaum in her office for about an hour to discuss the importance of the office and afterwards thanked her for her service.

On March 10, Fordham Law School hosted a town hall meeting with Gioia, Siegel, de Blasio and Green.  Zablocki was not invited, which he considered an "outrage".  The organizer said that he believed students wanted to see the Democratic contenders first, and wished to set up a debate including Zablocki in the future.

Endorsements
De Blasio was endorsed by The New York Times, the Working Families Party, and over 150 elected officials and organizations.  Gioia was endorsed by various labor unions, including Local One of the Stagehands, the Sergeants Benevolent Association (SBA) and the Captains Endowment Association (CEA).  Alex Zablocki was endorsed by all five Republican county organizations in New York City, led by his home borough of Staten Island. Alex Zablocki was also endorsed by the Staten Island Advance on October 30, 2009, as well as The Wave, Rockaway's leading newspaper, on October 23, 2009.

Results

Democratic primary

Tuesday, September 15, 2009

Official results from the New York City Board of Elections as of September 25, 2009:

As no candidate reached 40%, a runoff election for de Blasio and Green set for September 29 was required.

Democratic Run-off Primary
Tuesday, September 29, 2009

Official returns (as reported on October 20, 2009):

Bill de Blasio became the Democratic nominee for public advocate.

General election
Tuesday, November 3, 2009

Source: Board of Elections in the City of New York http://www.vote.nyc.ny.us/results.html

Bill de Blasio was elected public advocate.

See also
New York City Public Advocate
Government of New York City
New York City mayoral election, 2009
New York City Comptroller election, 2009

External links
Candidate websites
Bill de Blasio for Public Advocate
Eric Gioia for New York
Mark Green
New Yorkers for Norman Siegel
Imtiaz S. Syed for Public Advocate
Alex Zablocki for Public Advocate

References

New York City Public Advocate
2009
Public Advocate
Bill de Blasio